The 1974 Speedway World Pairs Championship was the fifth FIM Speedway World Pairs Championship. The final took place at the Hyde Road Speedway in Belle Vue, Manchester, England. The championship was won by Sweden (28 points) from Australia (23 pts) and New Zealand (21 pts). Host nation England, represented by Peter Collins and Dave Jessup, finished 4th with 21 points.

Swedish rider Anders Michanek, who successfully defended his World Pairs crown at this meeting, completed the double later in 1974 when he won the Individual World Championship.

Semifinal 1
  Prelog
 May 26

Semifinal 2
  Rodenbach
 May 26

World final
  Manchester, Hyde Road
 13 July

See also
 1974 Individual Speedway World Championship
 1974 Speedway World Team Cup
 motorcycle speedway
 1974 in sports

References

1974
World Pairs
Speedway World Pairs
International sports competitions in Manchester